Kulankaxajicabdi is a town in the central Hiran region of Somalia.

References
Kulanka Xaji Cabdi

Populated places in Hiran, Somalia